John Thomas Mungin Jr. (September 30, 1904 – April 12, 1976), nicknamed "Bill", was an American Negro league pitcher in the 1920s.

A native of McIntosh County, Georgia, Mungin made his Negro leagues debut in 1925 for the Baltimore Black Sox. He played for Baltimore again the following season, and finished his career with the Harrisburg Giants in 1927. Mungin died in Baltimore, Maryland in 1976 at age 71.

References

External links
 and Seamheads

1904 births
1976 deaths
Baltimore Black Sox players
Harrisburg Giants players
20th-century African-American sportspeople
Baseball pitchers